Free Church Parsonage is a historic church parsonage at the junction of William and Grinnell Streets in Rhinecliff, Dutchess County, New York. It was built about 1869 and is a -story, frame cottage with board-and-batten siding in the Gothic Revival style. It has a medium pitched gable roof and has a 1-story hip-roofed verandah.  Also on the property is a contributing stone wall.

It was added to the National Register of Historic Places in 1987.

References

Properties of religious function on the National Register of Historic Places in New York (state)
Carpenter Gothic architecture in New York (state)
Churches completed in 1869
Churches in Dutchess County, New York
Clergy houses in the United States
1869 establishments in New York (state)
National Register of Historic Places in Dutchess County, New York